The canton of Stiring-Wendel is an administrative division of the Moselle department, northeastern France. Its borders were modified at the French canton reorganisation which came into effect in March 2015. Its seat is in Stiring-Wendel.

It consists of the following communes:
 
Alsting 
Behren-lès-Forbach
Bousbach
Diebling
Etzling
Farschviller
Folkling
Kerbach
Metzing
Nousseviller-Saint-Nabor
Spicheren
Stiring-Wendel
Tenteling
Théding

References

Cantons of Moselle (department)